Ralph Raico (October 23, 1936 – December 13, 2016) was an American libertarian historian of European liberalism and a professor of history at Buffalo State College.

Early life and education 
Raico was from New York City, where he attended The Bronx High School of Science. Through the Foundation for Economic Education, Raico and his classmate George Reisman arranged to meet with economist Ludwig von Mises, who subsequently invited them to attend his graduate seminar on Austrian economics at the New York University. There, he met fellow seminar attendee Murray Rothbard, who befriended him. Rothbard and his friends Raico, Reisman, Ronald Hamowy and Robert Hessen formed a "self-conscious intellectual and activist salon" they named the Circle Bastiat.

In the mid-1950s, the Circle Bastiat also brought Raico into contact with novelist Ayn Rand and her followers, informally known at the time as The Collective. Raico attended the first lectures about Rand's philosophy of Objectivism. Eventually, relations between the two groups soured, leading to an incident in which the Circle parodied the Collective, performing a skit in which Raico played the part of Rand's protege Nathaniel Branden. By the summer of 1958, Rand and Rothbard had broken off all ties, and the groups stopped associating.

Raico received his B.A. from the City College of New York and his Ph.D. from the University of Chicago, where his adviser was Friedrich Hayek.

Career 
While at the University of Chicago, Raico founded The New Individualist Review, a libertarian publication which first published in April 1961 and produced 17 issues until it ceased publication in 1968. Raico and other graduate students comprised the editorial board. Hayek and Milton Friedman and later economist George Stigler were on the advisory board. In 1981, Friedman wrote that he believed the publication had "set an intellectual standard which has not yet, I believe, been matched by any of the more recent publications in the same philosophical tradition".

Raico later became senior editor of Inquiry magazine. He was an associate editor of The Independent Review (a journal published by The Independent Institute) and a senior fellow of the Mises Institute which published his work on the history of liberty and the connection between war and the state. Raico translated Mises' book Liberalismus and various essays by Friedrich Hayek into English.

Death 
Raico died on December 13, 2016 at the age of 80.

Publications

Books 
 Gay Rights: A Libertarian Approach. Libertarian Party (1975). .
 Classical Liberalism in the Twentieth Century. Institute for Humane Studies at George Mason University (1990). .
 Die Partei der Freiheit: Studien zur Geschichte des deutschen Liberalismus. Introduction by Christian Watrin. Translated by Gabriele Bartel, Pia Weiss, and Jörg Guido Hülsmann. Lucius & Lucius (1999). . .
 Great Wars and Great Leaders: A Libertarian Rebuttal. Introduction by Robert Higgs. Auburn, Alabama: Mises Institute (2010) . .
 The Place of Religion in the Liberal Philosophy of Constant, Tocqueville, and Lord Acton. (2010). . .
 Book version of Raico's University of Chicago dissertation.
 Classical Liberalism and the Austrian School. Auburn, Alabama: Mises Institute (2012). . .

Book contributions 
 "Classical Liberalism and the Austrian School." in The Elgar Companion to Austrian Economics, edited by Peter J. Boettke. Edward Elgar Publishing (1988). . .
 Introduction to the 50th-anniversary edition of John T. Flynn's The Roosevelt Myth. Fox & Wilkes (1998).. .
 "World War I: The Turning Point" and "Rethinking Churchill." in The Costs of War: America's Pyrrhic Victories, edited by John V. Denson. Transaction Publishers (1999). .

See also 
 List of Austrian School economists

References

Works cited

External links 
 Raico's article archives at Mises.org
 Raico book and paper archives at Mises.org
 Raico's archives at LewRockwell.com
 Bio at Future of Freedom Foundation
 Ralph Raico: Champion of Authentic Liberalism

1936 births
2016 deaths
20th-century American historians
20th-century American male writers
20th-century American non-fiction writers
21st-century American historians
21st-century American male writers
21st-century American non-fiction writers
American libertarians
American male non-fiction writers
American political writers
Buffalo State College faculty
City College of New York alumni
Historians from New York (state)
Libertarian historians
Libertarian theorists
Mises Institute people
Non-interventionism
People from New York City
University of Chicago alumni
Writers from New York City